The 50th International Emmy Awards ceremony took place on November 21, 2022, at the New York Hilton Midtown Hotel in New York City, recognizing excellence in television programs produced and aired originally outside the United States, and U.S. primetime programs in languages other than English between the dates of January 1, 2021 and December 31, 2021. The award ceremony, presented by the International Academy of Television Arts and Sciences (IATAS) was hosted by Penn Jillette. The nominations were announced on September 29, 2022.

In response to the Russian invasion of Ukraine, the International Academy announced in March 2022 that all programs produced or co-produced by Russian-based companies will be banned from this year's International Emmys. Children's programs competing in the International Emmy Kids Awards were presented during the International Emmy Awards Gala. This year, the International Academy presented for the first time a new Sports Documentary category.

Ceremony information
Nominations for the 50th International Emmy Awards were announced on September 29, 2022, by the International Academy of Television Arts & Sciences (IATAS). There are 60 nominees across 15 categories and 23 countries. Nominees come from: Argentina, Australia, Brazil, Chile, China, Colombia, France, Germany, Japan, Mexico, the Netherlands, New Zealand, Norway, Philippines, Qatar, Singapore, South Africa, South Korea, Spain, Sweden, United Arab Emirates, the United Kingdom and the United States. All these programs were broadcast between January 1 and December 31, 2021; in accordance with the competition's eligibility period.

In addition to the presentation of the International Emmys for programming and performances, the International Academy presented two special awards. Ava DuVernay received the International Emmys’ Founders Award, which was presented by Blair Underwood. The Directorate Award went to Miky Lee, Vice Chairwoman of CJ Group. It was presented by South Korean actor Song Joong-ki.

Broadcast
The event was broadcast live on the International Academy’s website (iemmy.tv) from 8 pm Eastern Time.

Winners
The nominees were announced on September 29, 2022.

Multiple nominations

Multiple wins

References

External links 
 International Academy of Television Arts and Sciences website

International Emmy Awards ceremonies
International Emmy Kids Awards ceremonies
International Emmy Awards
International Emmy Awards
International Emmy Awards
International Emmy Awards
International Emmy Awards